Turn It Upside Down is the second studio album and fourth release overall by American rock band Spin Doctors, released in 1994. It is the follow-up album to their successful RIAA 5× Platinum album Pocket Full of Kryptonite. Though not as commercially or critically successful as their debut album, Turn It Upside Down was certified Platinum in the US. It also yielded three minor hit singles—"Cleopatra's Cat", "Mary Jane" and "You Let Your Heart Go Too Fast"—in the UK, with lead single "Cleopatra's Cat" making the top 30 (No. 29); "You Let Your Heart Go Too Fast" was also a minor US hit, just missing out on the Top 40, peaking at No. 42.

Track listing

Personnel
Spin Doctors
Chris Barron – lead vocals, acoustic guitar on "Mary Jane"
Eric Schenkman – guitar, lead vocals on "Indifference", backing vocals on "Bags of Dirt", piano on "More Than Meets the Ear"
Mark White – bass
Aaron Comess – drums, clavinet on "Big Fat Funky Booty", piano on "Mary Jane", organ on "Laraby's Gang"

Additional musicians
Andrew Comess – organ on "You Let Your Heart Go Too Fast" and "Mary Jane"

Production
Producers: Peter Denenberg, Frankie La Rocka, Spin Doctors
Engineer: Peter Denenberg
Mixing: Peter Denenberg
Mastering: Ted Jensen

Charts

Certifications

References

Spin Doctors albums
1994 albums
Epic Records albums